Reporter's Notebook is a Philippine television documentary show broadcast by GMA Network, GMA News TV and GTV. Originally hosted by Jiggy Manicad and Maki Pulido, it premiered on June 1, 2004 on the network's Tuesday evening line up. The show concluded on GMA Network on April 25, 2020. The show moved to GMA News TV on August 6, 2020, on the network's Power Block line up. Pulido and Jun Veneracion served as the final hosts. The show returned to GMA Network on January 7, 2021.

Hosts

 Jiggy Manicad 
 Maki Pulido 
 Rhea Santos 
 Jun Veneracion

Production
In March 2020, production was halted due to the enhanced community quarantine in Luzon caused by the COVID-19 pandemic. The show resumed its programming on August 6, 2020.

Accolades

References

External links
 
 

2004 Philippine television series debuts
2022 Philippine television series endings
Filipino-language television shows
GMA Network original programming
GMA Integrated News and Public Affairs shows
GMA News TV original programming
Philippine documentary television series
Television productions suspended due to the COVID-19 pandemic